Oaky River, a perennial stream of the Macleay River catchment, is located in the Northern Tablelands district of New South Wales, Australia.

Course and features
Oaky River rises on the southern slopes of Round Mountain, the highest peak of the Snowy Range, a spur of the Great Dividing Range south southwest of Ebor, and flows generally southwest, joined by one minor tributary before reaching its confluence with the Chandler River, southwest of Jeogla. The river descends  over its  course; rapidly descending into a deep gorge where it meets the Chandler River.

The upper reaches of Oaky River are transversed by the Waterfall Way between Wollomombi and Ebor.

Oaky River and its tributaries are trout streams and platypus may be sighted in the waters.

Reservoir & Hydroelectric Power Station
A hydroelectric power station is located at the dam and the flow of water is used to generate electricity. The power station has five turbines that generate . Zihni Buzo, an Albanian migrant and Harvard-educated civil engineer was the leading engineer on the construction of the dam and hydroelectric scheme. This dam burst in February 2013 and is no longer viable.

See also

 List of rivers of Australia
 Rivers of New South Wales

References

External links
 

Rivers of New South Wales
Northern Tablelands